John R. Lampe is a professor of history at the University of Maryland.

Biography
Lampe received his PhD from the University of Wisconsin–Madison in 1971.

He has published several books; his first was Balkan Economic History, 1550-1950, From Imperial Borderlands to Developing Nations, with Marvin Jackson, published by Indiana University Press in 1982. It was the winner of the first annual Vucinich Prize from the American Association for the Advancement of Slavic Studies. He is also the author of Balkans into Southeastern Europe and Yugoslavia as History: Twice There Was a Country, which was initially published in 1996 and went into a second edition in 2000.

Lampe was Director of the East European Studies program at the Woodrow Wilson International Center for Scholars. He has been a senior scholar there since 2007.

References

External links 

20th-century American historians
20th-century American male writers
21st-century American historians
21st-century American male writers
Living people
University of Wisconsin–Madison alumni
University of Maryland, College Park faculty
Year of birth missing (living people)
Historians of the Balkans
American male non-fiction writers